Me & Jerry is the first duet studio album by Chet Atkins and Jerry Reed, released in 1970. Consisting of pop, country and standards, this collaboration won the 1971 Grammy Award for Best Country Instrumental Performance.

It was followed by Me & Chet in 1972.

Reception

In his review for Allmusic, critic Stephen Thomas Erlewine wrote of the album; "virtuosity is always more appealing when it doesn't call attention to itself, a trap Atkins and Reed always avoid here. The two simply lay back and play, trading lines and licks with an easy grace, having so much fun that it's impossible to not share in their joy."

Reissues 
 In 1998, Me & Jerry and Me & Chet were reissued on CD by One Way Records.

Track listing

Side one 
 "Tennessee Stud" (Jimmy Driftwood) – 3:05
 "Bridge Over Troubled Water" (Paul Simon) – 3:06
 "MacArthur Park" (Jimmy Webb) – 2:45
 "Ol' Man River" (Oscar Hammerstein, Jerome Kern) – 2:52
 "Nut Sundae" (Jerry Reed Hubbard) – 2:37

Side two 
 "Cannonball Rag" (Merle Travis) – 2:13
 "Wreck of the John B" – 2:55
 "Stumpwater" (Hubbard) – 2:15
 "The January February March" (Hubbard) – 2:48
 "Something" (George Harrison) – 2:14

Personnel 
 Chet Atkins – guitar
 Jerry Reed – guitar

Production notes 
 Tom Pick – engineer
 Ray Butts – recording technician
 Ashley Scott – cover photo

References 

1970 albums
Chet Atkins albums
Jerry Reed albums
RCA Records albums
Collaborative albums
Grammy Award winners
Albums produced by Bob Ferguson (music)